Carfrae Bastle is a small ruined tower house about  north of Lauder, Scottish Borders, Scotland, near Hillhouse

History
Carfrae Bastle is of medieval origin. The bastle has a strategic position commanding the passes from Upper Lauderdale into Lothian, by way of Glengelt and Kelphope glens. Carfrae is first mentioned in a charter in which William de Morville, son of Richard de Morville, Lord of Lauderdale, grants the lands and barony of Carfrae to Henry St Clair, in around 1196. The barony encompassed much of the eastern part of the parish of Channelkirk.

Structure
The overgrown remains of rubble masonry stand to first floor height. There is a vaulted basement while the remains of a round stair-tower stand in the southeast angle.

See also
Castles in Great Britain and Ireland
List of castles in Scotland

References

Castles in the Scottish Borders